New Moon is a 1930 black-and-white American, pre-Code romantic/drama/melodrama musical film version of the operetta The New Moon, with music by Sigmund Romberg and book and lyrics by Oscar Hammerstein II and others. The original stage version premiered on Broadway in 1928. The 1930 film is also known as Komissa Strogoff in Greece, Nymånen in Denmark and Passione cosacca in Italy. A second adaptation, also titled New Moon, was released in 1940.

The 1930 film, directed by Jack Conway, starred Grace Moore and Lawrence Tibbett. Its plot is entirely different from the original play and is set in Russia. This version added new songs not by Romberg.

Synopsis
New Moon is the name of a ship crossing the Caspian Sea. A young man named Lt. Petroff meets Princess Tanya and they have a ship-board romance. Upon arriving at the port of Krasnov, Petroff learns that Tanya is engaged to Governor Brusiloff.

Petroff, disillusioned, crashes the ball to talk with Tanya. When the couple are found by Brusiloff, they invent a story about her lost bracelet. To reward him, and remove him, Brusiloff sends Petroff to the remote, and deadly, Fort Darvaz. Soon, the big battle against overwhelming odds will begin.

Cast
 Lawrence Tibbett as Lieutenant Michael Petroff
 Grace Moore as Princess Tanya Strogoff
 Adolphe Menjou as Governor Boris Brusiloff
 Roland Young as Count Igor Strogoff
 Gus Shy as Potkin
 Emily Fitzroy as Countess Anastasia Strogoff

Soundtrack
 "Lover, Come Back to Me"
(1928)
Music by Sigmund Romberg
Lyrics by Oscar Hammerstein II
Played during the opening credits
Sung by Lawrence Tibbett at the tavern
Reprised by him and Grace Moore at the fort
 "Farmer's Daughter"
(1930)
Music by Herbert Stothart
Lyrics by Clifford Grey
Played by the band on the ship and sung in a gypsy language by Lawrence Tibbett
Reprised by him with an English translation
Played on piano and sung in the gypsy language by Grace Moore
 "Wanting You"
(1928)
Music by Sigmund Romberg
Lyrics by Oscar Hammerstein II
Sung a cappella by Lawrence Tibbett on the ship
Reprised by him and Grace Moore on the ship
 "One Kiss"
(1928)
Music by Sigmund Romberg
Lyrics by Oscar Hammerstein II
Played on piano (and studio orchestra) and sung by Grace Moore
 "What Is Your Price Madam?"
(1930)
Music by Herbert Stothart
Lyrics by Clifford Grey
Played by the orchestra at the ball and sung by Lawrence Tibbett
 "Stout Hearted Men"
(1928)
Music by Sigmund Romberg
Lyrics by Oscar Hammerstein II
Sung by Lawrence Tibbett and soldiers at the fort
Reprised by the men returning from the battle

Background and production
 The operetta The New Moon opened on Broadway in New York City on September 19, 1928 and closed on December 14, 1929 after 519 performances. The leads were played by Robert Halliday and Evelyn Herbert, and the supporting cast included Gus Shy, who also in this film.
 Some production charts included Hale Hamilton and Marie Mosquini in the cast, but they were not seen in the movie.
 Modern sources include in this film the songs "Marianne", "Funny Little Sailor Man" and "Softly, As in a Morning Sunrise" (all from the original stage production), but they were not heard.
 The credits list New Moon as the title of the original operetta, but its title was The New Moon.
 The production dates were from July 22, 1930 until October 3, 1930.

Film Connections
 A second film version of New Moon was remade in 1940 also titled New Moon and the Public Broadcasting Services (PBS) TV Series Great Performances: The New Moon (#17.2)" (1989), are all considered to be based on the stage play The New Moon.
 New Moon is featured in the 1954 film Deep in My Heart – the Romberg written production number.

External links
 
 
 
 

1930 films
1930 musical films
American black-and-white films
Films based on operettas
Films directed by Jack Conway
Films set in the Caspian Sea
Films set in Russia
Metro-Goldwyn-Mayer films
Operetta films
Films with screenplays by Cyril Hume
American musical films
1930s American films